Cranston, Cranstoun or Cranstone  is a Scottish surname originating in a clan that lived around Roxburgh in the Scottish Borders. It is a minor clan but has its own tartan and clan brooch. Notable people with the surname include:

 Alan Cranston (1914–2000), American politician from California
 Andrew Cranston (b. 1969), Scottish painter
 Bryan Cranston (b. 1956), American actor
 Catherine Cranston (1849–1934), also known as Kate Cranston or Miss Cranston, tea room proprietor
 Earl Cranston (1840–1932), bishop of the Methodist Episcopal Church
 Edwin Cranston, professor of Japanese at Harvard University
 Emily Cranston, Canadian chemist
 John Cranston, colonial governor of Rhode Island
 Ken Cranston (1917-2007), former English cricketer
 Kyle Cranston (b. 1992), Australian Decathlete, 2017 World University Games Decathlon Champion
 Lefevre James Cranstone (1822–1893), English artist
 Maurice Cranston (1920–1993), British philosopher and political scientist
 Ross Cranston (b. 1948), British lawyer and politician, member of Parliament for Dudley
 Samuel Cranston, colonial governor of Rhode Island
 Tim Cranston (b. 1962), Canadian ice hockey player
 Tom Cranston (footballer) (1891–1916), Scottish footballer
 Thomas George Cranston (1877–1954), Irish chess player
 Toller Cranston (1949–2015), Canadian figure skater and artist

Fictional characters:
Billy Cranston, a character from the Power Rangers universe
Lamont Cranston, a crime-fighting vigilante from the 1930s series, The Shadow
Kirk Cranston, a fictional character on the NBC daytime soap Santa Barbara
Rachel Cranston, a female character on the NCIS
Chuck Cranston, the lowlife boyfriend of Ariel Moore in the movie Footloose

Surnames of British Isles origin